The ECB National Club Twenty20 is a knockout Twenty20 club cricket competition in England. It was established in 2008 and the inaugural winners were South Northumberland. The competition is currently known for sponsorship reasons as the Vitality Club T20. The current champions (2022) are Hornchurch CC

Format

The tournament, along with the national club competition, is aligned with the ECB Premier Leagues and to enter the tournament you must be a part of an ECB Premier League or invited to take part by one.

The early rounds are organised by each of the 32 ECB Premier leagues with a requirement to put a winner forward to the national rounds by the first week in June.

All rounds are played in 3 or 4 team one-day competitions, where either 3 teams play in a round-robin to determine a winner or 4 teams play a knockout. The 8 winners of these knockouts go to a semi final played at 2 venues, where the 2 winners of this knock out play in a final, traditionally in September. In previous years the finals day has been a 4 team knockout but it has since been changed to a straight final.

Winners
Cockspur Club Twenty20
2008: South Northumberland
2009: Bournemouth
2010: Swardeston

Natwest Club Twenty20
2011: Ealing
2012: Wimbledon
2013: Wimbledon
2014: Chester Boughton Hall
2015: Ealing
2016: Swardeston
2017: South Northumberland
Vitality Club T20
2018: Hanging Heaton
2019: Swardeston
2021: Tunbridge Wells
2022: Hornchurch

References

External links
 Play-Cricket.com tournament page

English domestic cricket competitions
Twenty20 cricket
Club cricket